Rashad Abdullayev (born 1 October 1981) is a retired Azerbaijani footballer who played as a midfielder.

Career

Gabala
In May 2012, Abdullayev signed a one-year contract with Gabala.
Abdullayev made his debut for Gabala on 4 August 2012 in a 1–1 draw away to Simurq. After scoring 5 goals in 28 appearances during his season at Gabala, his contract was not renewed and he left the club.

FK Baku
Shortley after his contract expired with Gabala, Abdullayev signed a one-year contract, worth in the region of $300,000, with FK Baku. On 23 July 2013, before Abdullayev had made a competitive appearance for the club, Abdullayev left FK Baku and joined city rivals Ravan Baku on loan.

AZAL
On 11 January 2014, Abdullayev cut short his loan with Ravan Baku, to move from Baku to AZAL on an 18-month contract.

Zira
After Abdullayev's contract with AZAL expired, he signed a one-year contract with newly promoted Zira FK. Zira announced on 23 May that Abdullayev had left the club at the end of his contract.

Career statistics

Club

International

Honours

Club
Khazar Lankaran
Azerbaijan Cup: 2007–08

Neftchi Baku
Azerbaijan Premier League: 2010–11, 2011–12

References

External links 

1981 births
Living people
Azerbaijani footballers
Association football midfielders
Footballers from Baku
Khazar Lankaran FK players
Gabala FC players
FC Baku players
Ravan Baku FC players
AZAL PFK players
Zira FK players
Azerbaijan Premier League players
Neftçi PFK players
Azerbaijan international footballers